Reginald or Reg Thomas may refer to:

 Reg Thomas (athlete) (1907–1946), Welsh athlete
 Reg Thomas (English footballer) (1912–1983), English footballer 
 Reg Thomas (Australian footballer) (1909–1966), Australian rules footballer
 Reg Thomas (ice hockey) (born 1953), Canadian ice hockey player
 Reggie Thomas (born 1953), American politician from the state of Kentucky
 Reggie (wrestler) (born 1993), American professional wrestler and former acrobat